Tony Wadsworth may refer to:

Tony Wadsworth (music executive), British music executive
Tony Wadsworth (radio presenter), British radio presenter with the BBC